Online Watch Link (OWL) is a commercial web application to manage watch schemes such as Neighbourhood Watch (United Kingdom) and Business Watch and to act as a communications platform to allow watch coordinators and the police to send out messages and high priority alerts to members. Alerts are mostly regarding current crimes in the area such as burglary and vehicle theft. Other watch schemes are supported such as Pub Watch, School Watch, Farm Watch and Shop Watch for example.

OWL is used by Hertfordshire Constabulary, and the Metropolitan Police Service. OWL was originally conceived and prototyped in early 2004, then redeveloped as a scalable application and launched in June 2006 and rolled out across all districts in Hertfordshire.

It was recognised by the UK Government in January 2009 by awarding it an e-Government National Award.

External links
OWL (Online Watch Link) for Neighbourhood Watch

References

Web applications
Community networks